Irina Petrovna Netreba Azerbaijani female wrestler. She is a European vice-champion in freestyle wrestling.

References

External links
 

Living people
Azerbaijani female sport wrestlers
Wrestlers at the 2015 European Games
European Games competitors for Azerbaijan
Year of birth missing (living people)
Universiade medalists in wrestling
Universiade silver medalists for Azerbaijan
Wrestlers at the 2019 European Games
World Wrestling Championships medalists
European Wrestling Championships medalists
Medalists at the 2013 Summer Universiade
21st-century Azerbaijani women